Jürgen Wilfried Falter (born 22 January 1944) is a German political scientist. His research interests include political extremism and xenophobia.

Born in Heppenheim, Hesse, Falter enrolled with a political science and modern history major at the University of Heidelberg in 1963 before finishing his studies with a Diplom at the Free University of Berlin in 1968. He earned his doctoral degree in 1973 and his Habilitation in 1981, both from the Saarland University.

In 1983 he accepted a chair at the Otto-Suhr-Institut in Berlin, a position he held until 1992. In 1993 he joined faculty at the University of Mainz.

Selected publications
.

.
.
.
.
.

References

External links
Website at the University of Mainz

1944 births
Living people
People from Bergstraße (district)
German political scientists
Free University of Berlin alumni
Academic staff of Johannes Gutenberg University Mainz